Alexander Caedmon Karp (born 2 October 1967) is an American billionaire businessman, and the co-founder and CEO of the software firm Palantir Technologies. As of April 2022, his estimated net worth is US$1.1 billion.

Early life
Alexander Caedmon Karp was born on 2 October 1967 in New York City, the son of a Jewish father and an African American mother, Karp was raised in Philadelphia and graduated from Central High School in 1985. He has said he struggled with dyslexia from an early age.

Karp earned a bachelor's degree from Haverford College (Haverford, Pennsylvania) in 1989, a juris doctor (JD) degree from Stanford University in 1992, and a Dr. phil. degree in neoclassical social theory from Goethe University (Frankfurt, Germany) in 2002. Karp's doctoral thesis, supervised by Karola Brede, was titled "Aggression in der Lebenswelt: Die Erweiterung des Parsonsschen Konzepts der Aggression durch die Beschreibung des Zusammenhangs von Jargon, Aggression und Kultur", which means "Aggression in the life-world: The extension of Parsons' concept of aggression by describing the connection between jargon, aggression, and culture."

Career
Karp has said he successfully invested in startups and stocks after receiving an inheritance from his grandfather.

Karp founded the London-based money management firm Caedmon Group.

In 2004, along with Peter Thiel (who had been a classmate at Stanford) and others, he co-founded Palantir as CEO.

Other activities 
 Axel Springer SE, Member of the Board of Directors (2018-2020)
 BASF, Member of the Board of Directors (until 2020)

Views 
Karp has described himself as a socialist and a progressive, and said he voted for Hillary Clinton. He espoused socialist views whilst at Stanford. In 2017, he was recorded during a Palantir company meeting claiming he turned down an invitation from President Trump, saying “I respect nothing about the dude.”

He has said that technology companies like Palantir have an obligation to support the U.S. military. He has defended Palantir's contract with U.S. Immigration and Customs Enforcement (ICE) during the controversy over family separations, saying that while separations are "a really tough, complex, jarring moral issue," he favors "a fair but rigorous immigration policy". He has said the U.S. government should have a strong hand in tech regulation and that western countries should dominate AI research.

Personal life
Karp lives in Grafton County, New Hampshire. Karp also owns a property in Palo Alto, California.

He is described as a wellness fanatic who swims, skis cross country, practices Qigong meditation and martial arts, and keeps Tai Chi swords in his offices.

References

External links
New York Times Magazine profile

1967 births
Living people
Haverford College alumni
Stanford University alumni
People from Palo Alto, California
Central High School (Philadelphia) alumni
Goethe University Frankfurt alumni
American billionaires
American company founders
20th-century American Jews
21st-century American Jews